The vestibulocerebellar tract is a tract in the pontine tegmentum which connects the vestibular nerve and the cerebellar cortex. It terminates in the Archicerebellum.

External links

Brainstem
Central nervous system pathways
Cerebellar connections
Vestibulocochlear nerve